Cyperus afrodunensis is a species of sedge that is native to an area in southern Somalia and coastal parts of Kenya.

The species was first formally described by the botanist Kåre Arnstein Lye in 1983.

See also
List of Cyperus species

References

External links
Cyperus afrodunensis Lye | Plants of the World Online

afrodunensis
Flora of Somalia
Flora of Kenya
Plants described in 1983
Taxa named by Kåre Arnstein Lye